Simon Paul Adams (20 December 1966 – 5 April 2021), known professionally as Paul Ritter, was an English actor. He had roles in films including Son of Rambow (2007), Quantum of Solace (2008), Harry Potter and the Half-Blood Prince (2009),  The Eagle (2011), and Operation Mincemeat (2021), as well as television programmes including Friday Night Dinner (2011–2020), Vera, The Hollow Crown, The Last Kingdom, Chernobyl, Belgravia and Resistance.

Early life
Ritter was born Simon Paul Adams on 20 December 1966 in Gravesend, Kent. His father Ken Adams, a toolmaker, worked at various power stations; his mother Joan ( Mooney) was a school secretary. His family were Catholic and he had four older sisters. Adams attended Gravesend Grammar School where he acquired an A Level in Theatre Studies. He went on to study Modern Languages at St John's College, Cambridge.

After graduating, he went to the Deutsches Schauspielhaus in Hamburg, Germany. Upon returning to the UK, he took the stage name Ritter, of German origin. He took this name because another Simon Adams was registered with the acting trade union, Equity, and he admired a German actor with the surname Ritter.

Ritter studied alongside the actor Stephen Mangan and they later acted together in the 2009 play The Norman Conquests.

Career
Ritter's screen work included roles in Nowhere Boy, the 2007 television serial Instinct, the comedy drama Pulling and the role of Pistol in Henry IV, Part II and Henry V in BBC Two's cycle of William Shakespeare's history plays, The Hollow Crown; The Daily Telegraph described Ritter as "an actor who is surely destined for greatness very soon. His Pistol conveyed perfectly the shock of a man who reluctantly had left behind the rowdy cheer of Eastcheap, and found himself in middle age contemplating the melancholy of a medieval autumn." Ritter also played comic actor Eric Sykes in Tommy Cooper: Not Like That, Like This and took a lead role in BBC One's 2014 serialised Cold War spy drama, The Game.

From 2005 to 2006, Ritter played Otis Gardiner in the original Royal National Theatre production of Helen Edmundson's Coram Boy, for which he was nominated for an Olivier Award. He was nominated for a Tony Award in 2009 for his role in The Norman Conquests. In 2012, he appeared as the protagonist's father in the stage version of Mark Haddon's novel The Curious Incident of the Dog in the Night-Time at the National Theatre and in 2013 as John Major in the premiere of Peter Morgan's The Audience.

He appeared in the first three series (2011-13) of the popular British crime drama, Vera, as pathologist Dr. Billy Cartwright.

From 2011 to 2020, Ritter starred as Martin Goodman in the Channel 4 comedy series, Friday Night Dinner. For this role, he received a posthumous nomination at the 2021 British Academy Television Awards for the Best Male Comedy Performance.

Ritter's final performance was in the Netflix Operation Mincemeat as Bentley Purchase. The film was released after his death and was dedicated to his memory.

Personal life and death
In 1996, Ritter married Polly Radcliffe, a research fellow at King's College London. He lived in Faversham, Kent. He had two sons named Frank and Noah.

Ritter died of a brain tumour on 5 April 2021, aged 54, in his home, surrounded by his family. Long-time friend Stephen Mangan tweeted: "Trying to find a way to talk about Paul Ritter and struggling. My friend since we were students together. So much talent and it shone from him even as a teenager. I was so lucky to know him and lucky too to work with him many times over the years. Wonderful man." Fellow actors from Friday Night Dinner also paid tribute. Writing in The Guardian, Tamsin Greig said she was "eternally grateful" to have known Ritter. Simon Bird said he always aspired to be like him, whilst Tom Rosenthal called him an "ultimate professional".

A tenth anniversary retrospective of Friday Night Dinner aired on 28 May 2021.

Filmography

Awards and nominations

References

External links

1966 births
2021 deaths
20th-century English male actors
21st-century English male actors
Deaths from brain cancer in England 
English male film actors
English male stage actors
English male television actors
English television actors
Male actors from Kent
People from Gravesend, Kent